The Shire of Towong is a local government area in the Hume region of Victoria, Australia, located in the north-east part of the state.

It includes the towns of Corryong, Tallangatta, Cudgewa, Bethanga, Bellbridge, Walwa, Tintaldra and Towong. It was formed in 1994 from the amalgamation of the Shire of Tallangatta and Shire of Upper Murray.

The Shire is governed and administered by the Towong Shire Council; its seat of local government and administrative centre is located at the council headquarters in Tallangatta, it also has a service centre located in Corryong. The Shire is named after an earlier shire, the Shire of Towong (1874–1920), which occupied the same region as the current LGA.

Council

Current composition
The council is composed of five councillors elected to represent an unsubdivided municipality.

Administration and governance
The council meets in the council chambers at the council headquarters in the Tallangatta Municipal Offices, which is also the location of the council's administrative activities. It also provides customer services at both its administrative centre in Tallangatta, and its service centre in Corryong.

Townships and localities
The 2021 census, the shire had a population of 6,223 up from 5,985 in the 2016 census

^ - Territory divided with another LGA

See also
 List of localities (Victoria)
 List of places on the Victorian Heritage Register in the Shire of Towong

References

External links
 
Towong Shire Council official website
Metlink local public transport map 
Link to Land Victoria interactive maps

Local government areas of Victoria (Australia)
Hume (region)